Víctor Clavijo Cobos (born 28 September 1973) is a Spanish actor. He earned early public recognition in Spain for his performance in the serial Al salir de clase.

Biography 
Víctor Clavijo Cobos was born in Algeciras on 28 September 1973. He studied law at the University of Granada but he eventually dropped out and moved instead to Madrid, graduating in Drama from the RESAD. Besides his theatrical performances, his first non-stage role came in 1995 with a performance in the short film David.

He landed one of his first television roles in the series Menudo es mi padre, where Clavijo played the son of El Fary's second wife. He became popular in Spain some time later for his breakout role as Raúl Daroca in the soap opera Al salir de clase, which he performed from 1998 to 2000.

Filmography

Television

Feature film

Accolades

References 

1973 births
Living people
21st-century Spanish male actors
Spanish male television actors
Spanish male stage actors
Spanish male film actors
People from Algeciras